The Falconar Golden Hawk is a Canadian tandem seat, pusher configuration, tricycle gear, canard-equipped ultralight aircraft that is offered in kit form by Falconar Avia of Edmonton, Alberta.

Design and development
The Golden Hawk traces its lineage to the American Aerolights Falcon of 1983. After Falcon production ended, three companies produced versions of the design. Team Falcon restarted production in 1998 with their Falcon 2000, Falcon East produced one with their Peregrine Falcon and Falconar Avia produced one and termed their version of the design the Golden Hawk.

The design has a composite fuselage and strut-braced wings made from aluminium and covered in doped aircraft fabric. The tip rudders and canard are also fabric-covered. The main landing gear is equipped with hydraulic disk brakes. The aircraft can be disassembled in ten minutes for ground transportation on a trailer or for storage.

The canard surface controls pitch, while roll is via conventional ailerons. Yaw is controlled with wing-tip rudders. The aircraft is advertised as spin-proof.

The Golden Hawk has been well received. Reviewer Andre Cliche described it as "a fantastic-looking aircraft that has no equal to stimulate the public's interest. Because of its futuristic looks Hollywood has used it several times in movies."

Variants

American Aerolights Falcon
Initial production version, introduced in 1983. Production ended by about 1984.
Team Falcon Falcon 2000
Improved production version introduced in 1998. Features longer landing gear to accommodate a large diameter propeller.
Falcon East Peregrine Falcon
Falconar ARV-1L Golden Hawk
Falconar ARV-1K Golden Hawk

Specifications (Golden Hawk)

References

External links

Official website archive
Photo of Golden Hawk

1980s Canadian ultralight aircraft
Canard aircraft
Golden Hawk
Single-engined pusher aircraft
High-wing aircraft
American Aerolights aircraft